Eurodom is a business, shopping and cultural center in Osijek, Croatia.

It is named after Eurodom company, which was established in 2002.

Business tower 

Business tower consists of two towers, which are popularly called Osijek Twins.

References

External links 
 Official website 

Buildings and structures in Osijek
Economy of Osijek